Great Coasters International, Inc. (GCI or GCII) is a Sunbury, Pennsylvania-based roller coaster manufacturer which has created several award-winning rides since its formation in 1994. Starting in 2006 with Thunderbird at PowerPark in Finland, the company expanded beyond the United States and began building coasters in Europe and Asia. Günter Engelhardt GmbH handles the company's marketing rights in Europe. In addition to designing and building new roller coasters, GCI also refurbishes and re-tracks existing roller coasters, regardless of manufacturer.

Roller coasters designed by GCI are known for their often curved drops, twisted layouts, and perception of high speed. Exciting elements such as the station fly-by and station fly-through have been incorporated in many of their layouts.

History
GCI was founded in 1994 by Mike Boodley and Clair Hain, Jr.  Boodley was a coaster designer previously with Custom Coasters International and Hain had gained a reputation throughout the industry as a master coaster builder.  In 1996, the firm opened Wildcat at Hersheypark which contained many of the signature elements the firm would soon become known for: tight sweeping curves, reminiscent of designs from the turn of the century by such noted coaster designers as Fred Church and Harry Traver.  In 2005, Boodley retired and assigned Jeff Pike with the responsibility as lead designer for the firm.  The first coaster that Pike is credited with is the Kentucky Rumbler at Beech Bend Park near Bowling Green, Kentucky.

Though GCI is capable of re-tracking roller coasters, they have not conducted many re-tracking projects. One of their most notable re-trackings was in 2016 for GhostRider at Knott's Berry Farm.

In November 2019 at an after party during the IAAPA convention, the company revealed a steel track prototype. The track is designed and engineered by Skyline Attractions and was later named Titan Track. The first installation of the track was a test section on White Lightning at Fun Spot America in September 2020.

Millennium Flyer trains

Most GCI-designed roller coasters run with in-house–designed articulated Millennium Flyer trains. The only exception is Roar at Six Flags America, which runs with Philadelphia Toboggan Coasters–designed trains. Gwazi at Busch Gardens Tampa Bay and GCI's first roller coaster, Wildcat at Hersheypark, also operated with PTC trains when they first opened, but both coasters were later modified to run with the Millennium Flyer trains. In 2016, when GCI retracked GhostRider, a Custom Coasters International wooden coaster at Knott's Berry Farm, they provided new Millennium Flyer trains. The following year, Wildcat at Lake Compounce also received Millennium Flyer trains, even though the coaster was made by Philadelphia Toboggan Coasters or PTC.

These trains are known for their cushioned seats, allowing riders to be comfortable during rides. These trains also contain individual lap bars which automatically lower and lock into a position to accommodate the rider, allowing quicker dispatch times. With their easily identified open, gate-like fronts, usually customized with the logo for the respective ride on which they are running, Millennium Flyer trains are styled similarly to trains seen during the golden age of rollercoasters.

GCI unveiled a new train design, the Infinity Flyer, at the 2018 IAAPA Expo in Orlando, Florida. The new train design was designed and engineered by Skyline Attractions and is capable of performing inversions and other elements.

List of roller coasters

As of 2019, Great Coasters International has built 29 roller coasters around the world.

Retracking

Roller Coaster at Lagoon
Wildcat at Lake Compounce
The Legend at Holiday World
Yankee Cannonball at Canobie Lake Park
Wolverine Wildcat at Michigan's Adventure
GhostRider  at Knott's Berry Farm
Predator at Darien Lake
The Racer  at Kings Island
Grizzly  at Kings Dominion

References

External links

GCI's official website

Roller coaster manufacturers
Companies based in Northumberland County, Pennsylvania
American companies established in 1994
Manufacturing companies established in 1994
1994 establishments in Pennsylvania
Manufacturing companies based in Pennsylvania